Online Mendelian Inheritance in Animals (OMIA) is an online database of genes, inherited disorders and traits in more than 135 animal species. It is modelled on, and is complementary to, Online Mendelian Inheritance in Man (OMIM). It aims to provide a publicly accessible catalogue of all animal phenes, excluding those in human and mouse, for which species specific resources are already available (OMIM, MLC). Authored by Professor Frank Nicholas of the University of Sydney, with some contribution from colleagues, the database contains textual information and references as well as links to relevant PubMed and Gene records at the NCBI.

OMIA is hosted by the University of Sydney, with an Entrez mirror located at the NCBI.

Maintenance
Currently the database is curated by its founder Professor Frank Nicholas. Planning is well advanced for enabling international experts to serve as electronic curators within their areas of expertise. Technical maintenance and improvement of OMIA has historically been conducted by a range of individuals.

See also
 Medical classification
 Online Mendelian Inheritance in Man (OMIM)

References
 OMIA (Online Mendelian Inheritance in Animals): an enhanced platform and integration into the Entrez search interface at NCBI. Nucleic Acids Res. 2006 Jan 1;34(Database issue):D599-601.  
 Online Mendelian Inheritance in Animals (OMIA): a comparative knowledgebase of genetic disorders and other familial traits in non-laboratory animals. Nucleic Acids Res. 2003 Jan 1;31(1):275-7.

External links 
 Online Mendelian Inheritance in Animals (OMIA)
 OMIA mirror at NCBI

Biological databases
Genetic animal diseases
Diagnosis classification